Qolqol Rud Rural District is a rural district (dehestan) in Qolqol Rud District, Tuyserkan County, Hamadan Province, Iran. At the 2006 census, its population was 6,221, in 1,469 families. The rural district has 15 villages.

References 

Rural Districts of Hamadan Province
Tuyserkan County